Bierlikör, or beer liqueur, is a beer-flavored liqueur, traditionally produced in the German state of Bavaria. As the term is not legally protected, individual products vary. Bierlikör can be made at home, but is also available commercially.

History 
Bierlikör has long existed as a niche, side product for breweries. Old or unsold beer was frequently made into Bierbrand or Bierlikör, both of which have a longer shelf life. A reference book from 1900 mentions a "Bier-Essenz", which is combined with neutral grain alcohol and sugar to produce a Bier-Likör. The rising popularity of craft beer in the 2010s in Germany has seen a revival of Bierlikör.

Commercial varieties

Legal 
The European Union directive on spirits does not define Bierlikör as a product type, nor does it list it as a protected designation of origin product. Anything sold as Bierlikör in the European Union only needs to conform to the general guidelines applicable to all liqueurs, allowing considerable room for variations in the finished products. As such, a Bierlikör must
 contain a minimum of 15 percent alcohol by volume and at least 100 grams of inverted sugar per liter,
 be created using ethyl alcohol of agricultural origin and/or distillate(s) of agricultural origin, 
 be flavored with natural, or nature-identical, flavorings, and
 be labeled with the alcohol content and a list of any food colorings.

Commercially available Bierlikör typically contains between 14 and 30 percent sugar by weight.

Production 
Bierlikör can be produced using fresh beer, but this is not required. The source of alcohol can be Bierbrand, neutral rectified spirit, or other conventional spirits such as rum, vodka, or Korn, or any combination thereof.

The typical beer flavor of Bierlikör can come from a number of different sources, such as beer, malt beer, malt extracts, hops, or unfermented wort.

Additional herbs and spices may be added as well, such as vanilla (or vanillin), cinnamon, and cloves.

Producers 
A number of producers sell Bierlikör commercially:
 Altbayerischer Bierlikör (25%)
 BIERlikör 22 (22%)
 HEILAND Doppelbockliqueur (22%)
 Hyldegard's Bierlikör (28%)
  Bierlikör (25%)
  Bierlikör (25%)
 Red Castle Brew Bierlikör (17.8%)
 Schwanenwirt's Bierlikör (32.5%)
 Tiersteiner Bierlikör (28%)
 Westerwälder Bierlikör (25%)

Recipes 
There are a number of recipes for homemade Bierlikör, mostly using a strong beer as a base (such as Schwarzbier or Bock), which is heated up with sugar and spices, cooled, and fortified with a distilled spirit.

References 

German beer culture
 
Liqueurs
Pages translated from German Wikipedia